Carex sororia is a tussock-forming species of perennial sedge in the family Cyperaceae. It is native to south eastern parts of South America.

See also
List of Carex species

References

sororia
Plants described in 1837
Taxa named by Carl Sigismund Kunth
Flora of Argentina
Flora of Brazil
Flora of Paraguay
Flora of Uruguay